Palaeopteryx (meaning "ancient wing") is a genus of theropod dinosaur now considered a nomen dubium.  It was named and misidentified by J. A. Jensen in 1981, then redescribed by Jensen and K. Padian in 1989. At that time the binomial Palaeopteryx thomsoni was deemed invalid by Jensen. The only referred specimen is a single bone fragment (BYU 2022).
 
Palaeopteryx (BYU 2022) has been the subject of much confusion on the internet, in the popular scientific press, and among creationist writers. It has been described as a possible bird older than Archaeopteryx, but it cannot be clearly assigned to Avialae, and its horizon is younger than that of Archaeopteryx, though it is still from the Jurassic.

It was described by Jensen in 1981 as an "avian – like" proximal left tibiotarsus. It was then listed by R. E. Molnar in 1985 in a survey of the earliest known birds. Jensen and Padian reidentified it as the distal right radius of "a small deinonychosaur or bird" in 1989.

BYU 2022 was collected in the 1970s by paleontological expeditions from Brigham Young University directed by J. A. Jensen. It was found in Late Jurassic deposits in the "Dry Mesa" quarry on the Uncompahgre Upwarp in western Colorado (Brushy Basin Member, Morrison Formation). It was found among mixed fossil remains that included pterosaur and dinosaur material. One notable specimen found with it is the right femur of a derived maniraptoran theropod (BYU 2023). It is probably too small to be from the same individual as BYU 2022. BYU 2023 shows apomorphies known only in advanced maniraptorans, including Microvenator, Microraptor, and Archaeopteryx.

BYU 2022 and 2023 are important because they are samples of small – bodied maniraptorans from Jurassic North America.

References
1. Jensen, James A. (1981b). Another look at Archaeopteryx as the world's oldest bird. The Journal of the Utah Academy of Sciences: Encyclia, 58:109 – 128.

2. Jensen, James A. & Padian, Kevin. (1989). Small pterosaurs and dinosaurs from the Uncompahgre fauna (Brushy Basin member, Morrison Formation: ?Tithonian), Late Jurassic, western Colorado. Journal of Paleontology Vol. 63 no. 3 pg. 364 – 373.

Late Jurassic dinosaurs of North America
Dinosaurs of the Morrison Formation
Prehistoric paravians
Nomina dubia
Fossil taxa described in 1981
Paleontology in Colorado